Laytonville is a census-designated place (CDP) in Mendocino County, California, United States. The population was 1,152 at the 2020 census, down from 1,227 at the 2010 census.

Geography
It is in the Long Valley, drained to the north by Tenmile Creek, a tributary of the South Fork of the Eel River.

U.S. Route 101 passes through the center of town, leading south through Willits  to Ukiah, the Mendocino county seat, and northwest  to Leggett.

History
The town was founded by Nova Scotian Frank B. Layton, who in 1874 built a blacksmithy and house at the site. The first post office opened in 1879.

Demographics

2010
The 2010 United States Census reported that the Laytonville CDP had a population of 1,227. The racial makeup of Laytonville was 839 (68.4%) White, 16 (1.3%) African American, 244 (19.9%) Native American, 10 (0.8%) Asian, 1 (0.1%) Pacific Islander, 60 (4.9%) from other races, and 57 (4.6%) from two or more races. Hispanic or Latino of any race were 141 persons (11.5%).

The Census reported that 1,226 people (99.9% of the population) lived in households, 1 (0.1%) lived in non-institutionalized group quarters, and 0 (0%) were institutionalized.

There were 493 households, out of which 163 (33.1%) had children under the age of 18 living in them, 166 (33.7%) were opposite-sex married couples living together, 82 (16.6%) had a female householder with no husband present, 48 (9.7%) had a male householder with no wife present.  There were 59 (12.0%) unmarried opposite-sex partnerships, and 8 (1.6%) same-sex married couples or partnerships. 146 households (29.6%) were made up of individuals, and 37 (7.5%) had someone living alone who was 65 years of age or older. The average household size was 2.49.  There were 296 families (60.0% of all households); the average family size was 3.04.

The population was spread out, with 271 people (22.1%) under the age of 18, 96 people (7.8%) aged 18 to 24, 326 people (26.6%) aged 25 to 44, 384 people (31.3%) aged 45 to 64, and 150 people (12.2%) who were 65 years of age or older.  The median age was 40.0 years. For every 100 females, there were 108.3 males.  For every 100 females age 18 and over, there were 104.7 males.

Of these 562 housing units in the Laytonville area, 270 (54.8%) were owner-occupied, and 223 (45.2%) were occupied by renters. The homeowner vacancy rate was 1.1%; the rental vacancy rate was 9.7%.  640 people (52.2% of the population) lived in owner-occupied housing units and 586 people (47.8%) lived in rental housing units.

2000
As of the census of 2000, there were 1,301 people, 496 households, and 344 families residing in the CDP. The racial makeup of the CDP was 75.17% White, 0.23% African American, 15.37% Native American, 0.69% Asian, 0.77% Pacific Islander, 2.23% from other races, and 5.53% from two or more races. Hispanic or Latino of any race were 8.30% of the population.

There were 496 households, out of which 33.3% had children under the age of 18 living with them, 46.2% were married couples living together, 15.1% had a female householder with no husband present, and 30.6% were non-families. 23.4% of all households were made up of individuals, and 8.7% had someone living alone who was 65 years of age or older.  The average household size was 2.62 and the average family size was 3.03.

In the CDP, the population was spread out, with 25.7% under the age of 18, 9.6% from 18 to 24, 26.7% from 25 to 44, 25.8% from 45 to 64, and 12.1% who were 65 years of age or older.  The median age was 38 years. For every 100 females, there were 101.1 males.  For every 100 females age 18 and over, there were 100.8 males.

The median income for a household in the CDP was $34,432, and the median income for a family was $38,080. Males had a median income of $33,269 versus $21,563 for females. The per capita income for the CDP was $19,367.  About 19.0% of families and 21.9% of the population were below the poverty line, including 29.1% of those under age 18 and 11.0% of those age 65 or over.

Politics

See also
 Hog Farm, a Laytonville organization considered to be America's longest-running hippie commune

References

Census-designated places in Mendocino County, California
Populated places established in 1874
Census-designated places in California
1874 establishments in California